"I'll Be Leaving Alone" is a song written by Dickey Lee and Wayland Holyfield, and recorded by American country music artist Charley Pride.  It was released in May 1977 as the third single from the album She's Just an Old Love Turned Memory.  The song was Pride's eighteenth number one on the country chart.  The single would stay at number one for one week and spent a total of twelve weeks on the country chart.

Charts

Weekly charts

Year-end charts

References

1977 singles
1977 songs
Charley Pride songs
Songs written by Dickey Lee
Songs written by Wayland Holyfield
RCA Records singles